Padmanava College of Engineering (PCE), Rourkela was established in academic year 1999-2000 to impart degree courses in engineering under the Padmanva Educational Trust, Bhubaneswar. The prime objective of the trust has been the promotion of facilities of technical education for people of west Odisha and around.

The institute is affiliated to Biju Patnaik University of Technology (BPUT) with ISO 9001:2000 certification.

The institute is now functioning in the campus of sector 4, Rourkela. The new campus of the college is under construction near sector 9.

References

Private engineering colleges in India
Engineering colleges in Odisha
Colleges affiliated with Biju Patnaik University of Technology
Universities and colleges in Rourkela
Educational institutions established in 1999
1999 establishments in Orissa